The Leica III is a rangefinder camera introduced by Leica in 1933, and produced in parallel with the Leica II series. Several models were produced over the years, with significant improvements.

The Leica III uses a coupled rangefinder distinct from the viewfinder. The viewfinder is set for a 50mm lens; use of shorter or longer lenses requires installing an alternate viewfinder on the accessory socket.

Accessories and miscellaneous images

Notes and references 
Image for Leica F is actually model IIIa

External links 

 Leica III by Karen Nakamura
 Leica III by luis triguez
 Leica IIIc by luis triguez
 Leica IIIf RDST by luis triguez
 Leica IIIf 3D model by Artem Lynnik
 History of the Screw Mount Leicas
 Leica III made since 1933
 Leica Screwmount

Leica rangefinder cameras
3